Saint-Firmin-des-Prés is a commune in the Loir-et-Cher department of central France.

Population

See also
Communes of the Loir-et-Cher department

References

Communes of Loir-et-Cher